The Concorde class was a type of 32-gun frigate of the French Navy, designed by Henri Chevillard, carrying 12-pounder long guns as their main armament. Three ships of this type were built between 1778 and 1779, and served during the American War of Independence and the French Revolutionary Wars.

Ships 
 Concorde
Builder: Rochefort
Begun: April 1777
Launched: 3 September 1777
Completed: January 1778
Fate: Captured by the Royal Navy on 15 February 1783. Sold on 21 February 1811.

 Courageuse
Builder: Rochefort 
Begun: September 1777 
Launched: 28 February 1778 
Completed: April 1778 
Fate: Captured by HMS Centaur in the action of 18 June 1799

 Hermione
Builder: Rochefort
Begun: March 1778
Launched: 28 April 1779
Completed: June 1779
Fate: Ran aground and wrecked due to a navigation error of her pilot at Croisic on 20 September 1793

 Hermione
Builder: Rochefort
Begun: 1997
Launched: 2012

Notes and references

Notes

References

Bibliography 
  
 

 
Frigate classes